Pierre Testu-Brissy (or possibly Tessu-Brissy) (1770? – 1829) was a pioneering French balloonist who achieved fame for making flights astride his horse.

Ballooning career
Testu-Brissy made his first balloon ascent in 1785 or 1786, and the first night ascent on 11 May or 18 June 1786 in a hydrogen balloon. He subsequently undertook more than 50 flights in his lifetime.

Gaston Tissandier's Histoire des ballons et des aéronautes célèbres (History of famous balloons and aeronauts) (published in 1887) described Testu-Brissy's earliest ballooning thus :

 During the last years of the eighteenth century, besides the military applications by men of heart and patriotism, balloons continued to contribute to national and military festivals. Three years before the Revolution, Testu-Brissy, a new aeronaut, gave himself the title of physicist and announced plans for a twenty-four hour balloon flight, using a hydrogen balloon with oars similar to Jean-Pierre Blanchard.

Scientific experimentation
On 18 June 1786 he flew for 11 hours and made the first electrical observations as he ascended into thunderclouds. He stated that he drew remarkable discharges from the clouds by means of an iron rod carried in the basket. He also experienced Saint Elmo's Fire, a phenomenon in which luminous plasma is created by a corona discharge from a rod-like object in an atmospheric electric field.

Damage compensation
In 1786 Testu-Brissy was the first man who was called upon to pay damages for crops which had been trampled (mostly) by the rustics who flocked to see him.

Equestrian ballooning
On 15 October 1798 in Paris, Testu-Brissy completed the first balloon flight on horseback, ascending from Bellevue, Meudon (Château de Bellevue). The horse, which had been trained to stand perfectly still regardless of surrounding activities, endured bleeding from its nose and ears due to the altitude.

Gaston Tissandier's Histoire des ballons et des aéronautes célèbres (History of famous balloons and aeronauts) described Testu-Brissy's equestrian ballooning thus :

 During the first days of the revolutionary Consulate, balloon ascents regained some favour with the public. Thus on 26 Vendémiaire of year VII (in the French Republican calendar : Autumn, 26 Grape harvest, equivalent to October 17th, 1798) Testu-Brissy performed an equestrian balloon ascent which has remained famous. He had built an elongated balloon to carry a large rectangular wooden platform where he sat astride his horse without it being tethered. Testu-Brissy ascended at Bellevue; but the experiment did not meet his expectations, so he tried again a few days later and succeeded beyond expectations. He landed on the plain of Nanterre and said that the horse had lost blood through its nostrils and ears.

Caveat - Contradictory dates
This article currently shows contradictions between sources regarding dates.
 Tetsu-Brissy's first flight is loosely reported by some sources as 1785 (First B-Ascent 1785; First B-Solo 18 Sep.1791 from Paris) or June 18, 1786, at 4.50 pm, from the Jardin du Luxembourg to the plain of Montmorency, Val-d'Oise.
 Tetsu-Brissy's 11 hour flight (night flight?) is reported by some sources as 11 May or 18 June 1786 from Paris.
 Tetsu-Brissy's equestrian stunt flight is loosely reported by some sources as 1786 (L'ascension de Cessu-Brissy à Limoges en 1786 Smithsonian image), or 1787 (Image on French plate from the 1800s), or 15 Oct.1798 or October 17, 1798 (26 Vendémiaire of year VII).

See also
 History of ballooning
 List of firsts in aviation
 Timeline of aviation - 18th century
 Jean-Pierre Blanchard
 Jacques Charles
 André-Jacques Garnerin
 Citoyenne Henri
 Nicolas-Louis Robert see (Les Frères Robert)
 Jean-François Pilâtre de Rozier, the first manned balloon flight using a Montgolfier hot-air balloon

Notes

References 

 Ballooning History
 Kites, Balloons, and Daredevils
 Airships Past and Present by A Hilderbrandt. 1908. Scientific Ballooning.

French balloonists
1770 births
1829 deaths